Jean-Luc Bideau (born 1 October 1940) is a Swiss film actor.

Personal life
Jean-Luc Bideau is married to Marcela Salivarova, a director of Czechoslovak origin. Together, they have two children: Nicolas, head of Presence Switzerland, and Martine, a doctor.

Theater

Filmography

References

External links

1940 births
Living people
20th-century Swiss male actors
21st-century Swiss male actors
Swiss male film actors
Actors from Geneva
Sociétaires of the Comédie-Française
Swiss male stage actors
French National Academy of Dramatic Arts alumni